Newspapers in Morocco are primarily published in Arabic and French, and to a lesser extent in Berber, English, and Spanish. Africa Liberal, a Spanish daily, was the first paper published in the country which was launched in 1820. Al Maghrib was the first Arabic newspaper of the country, and was established in 1886.

In 1999, the number of French language newspapers distributed in the country was 130,000 while it was 62,000 in 1981. As of 2013, 71% of the papers were published in Arabic and 27% in French.

History 

The first newspaper to appear in Morocco was Pedro Antonio de Alarcón's El Eco de Tetuan, which published one edition in March 1860. Later in 1860, two Spanish soldiers fighting in the Hispano-Moroccan War (1859–60) launched El Noticiero (periodical), which published 89 editions before ceasing in 1861. The period after the 1880 Madrid Conference saw the rise of al-Moghreb al-Aksa, printed in Spanish by G.T. Abrines, and the Times of Morocco,  printed in English by Budgett Meakin; these two papers would later join and become the Tangier Gazette.

Al Maghrib was the first Arabic newspaper of the country, and was established in 1886. In 1908 the Sultan launches "Lissan Al Maghrib" the first state owned official media in Arabic.

El Eco Mauritano (1885-1930) was a political, literary, and general interest periodical founded by Isaac Toledano and Isaac Laredo of Tangier and Agustín Lugaro of Gibraltar.

Following the bombardment and invasion of Casablanca in 1907, a French daily called  was founded at the behest of General Albert d'Amade in 1908. With a conservative, colonial editorial line that rejected any notion of Moroccan sovereignty and supported the idea of making Morocco an extension of French Algeria, it became one of the most important French publications in the period of the French Protectorate.

Another major publication of the early colonial period was L'Echo du Maroc, which was published in 4 editions: one for Rabat, one for Casablanca, one for the south, and one for the north. In 1919, Pierre Mas began , his media empire in Morocco, with his purchase of L'Echo du Maroc.

Due to the French colonial authorities' censorship of newspapers in Arabic, Muhammad Hassan al-Wazzani founded L'Action du Peuple, a Moroccan nationalist newspaper published in French.

Press in Arabic 
Al Maghrib was the first Arabic newspaper of the country, and was established in 1886. It was a local media, based in Tetouan.

The first national newspaper to be published in Arabic by Moroccans was an-Nafahat az-Zakiya fi l-Akhbar il-Maghrebiya ( The Pleasant Notes in the News of Morocco) in 1889.

es-Saada ( Happiness) was arabophone newspaper promoting the French position on events in Morocco published at the French Legation in Tangier, first appearing in 1904. With French encouragement, supporters of Abdelaziz founded as-Sabaah in Tangier in 1904; its editor was an Algerian named Idriss Khubzawi and it published 52 issues. Idhar al-Haqq, edited by a nationalist figure named Abu Bakr Ben Abd al-Wahab, was also founded in Tangier in 1904. After the 1906 Algeciras Conference, the Sufi leader Muhammad Bin Abd al-Kabiir al-Kataani started publishing a periodical entitled at-Taa'oon ( The Plague) in response to the colonial press and European colonialism in general.

In 1908, Sultan Abd al-Hafid founded Lisan al-Maghrib, an arabophone newspaper funded by the Moroccan government; it was run by two Lebanese brothers, Faraj-Allah and Artur Namor, and it famously printed the 1908 draft constitution, as well as open letters to Abdelaziz and then Abd al-Hafid.

In 1909, the Spanish started publishing an arabophone newspaper called Telegraph ar-Rif, then a newspaper called al-Haqq in 1911 to push their position. The newspaper at-Taraqqi also presented a colonial perspective and was published in Tangier in 1913. They were followed by al-Islah, a quasi-official Spanish newspaper published in 1916. These publications were similar to es-Saada in their objective.

The first arabophone newspaper in Casablanca was published in 1912: al-Akhbar al-Maghrebiya, financed by Badar ad-Diin al-Badrawi; in Marrakesh, al-Janoob al-Maghrebi in 1927.

Among the first colonial policies promulgated by the French authorities under the French protectorate was a policy designed to censor the Moroccan press; Moroccan newspapers, whether Jewish or Muslim, had to receive advanced authorization from the French authorities, while European publications were not required to do this. The French authorities forbade Moroccan nationalists from publishing in areas under French control, especially in Arabic.

Akhbar al-Maghreb was published in Darija in 1915.

an-Nidthaam was published by an Egyptian in 1924 in Tangier.

Akhbar Teleghraphiya, covering national and international news as well as the affairs of al-Majlis al-Baladi and meant to "disinform" its Moroccan audience, was published in Fes and edited by Tahar Mahawi Zidan.

al-Ittihaad al-Ghanami, syndicated throughout the Maghreb, was first published in Tunis 1929

al-Ittihaad was published in 1927 and covered all the regions of the north under Spanish control.

In the north appeared Mohammed Daoud's journal as-Salaam, the newspaper al-Hayaat, followed by an explosion of periodicals including al-Wihdat al-Maghrebiya published by Muḥammad al-Makkī an-Nāṣirī, al-Hurriya published by Abdelkhalek Torres, ar-Rif, and others. Al-Atlas was the mouthpiece of the Moroccan Action Committee and expressed the views of the Moroccan Nationalist Movement.

The journal Majallat al-Maghreb was directed by Mohamed Ben Saleh Maysa an Algerian resident of Morocco working in Rabat.

In 1937, Said Hajji of Salé founded Al-Maghrib ( Morocco), a newspaper critical of French colonialism that was often censored.

The newspaper Al-Alam, speaking for the Istiqlal Party, was founded in 1946.

Muhammad Hassan al-Wazzani's ar-Ra'i al-'Aam—the mouthpiece of Democratic Independence Party, which had recently splintered from the Istiqlal Party—published its first issue on April 12, 1947.

The National Union of Popular Forces founded Al Muharrir, which published its first edition December 1964. It was edited by Omar Benjelloun until his assassination in 1975.

Jewish press 

In 1883, Abraham Lévy-Cohen founded the first francophone newspaper in Morocco, to spread French language and culture among the Moroccan Jews. A man named Salomon Benaïoun started Kol Israel (1891), Mébasser Tov (1894-1895), and Moghrabi (1904), though these periodicals were short-lived. Benaïoun also founded  (1915-1922), which covered Jewish interests in Morocco in two different editions: one in Judeo-Arabic and one in French. Adelante (1929-1932) was an independent hispanophone bimonthly periodical.

In Casablanca, the Hadida brothers edited Or Ha’Maarav, or La Lumiere du Maroc (1922-1924), a Zionist newspaper written in Judeo-Arabic with Hebrew script, which ran from 1922 until the French authorities shut it down in 1924. It was followed by L'Avenir Illustré (1926-1940) a nationalist, pro-Zionist francophone newspaper, edited by Jonathan Thurz as well as l'Union Marocaine (1932-1940), a francophone newspaper in line with emancipatory views of the AIU, edited by Élie Nattaf. L'Avenir Illustré and L'Union Marocaine were both shut down by the Vichy regime.

List of newspapers 
Below is a list of newspapers published in Morocco:

Legend

 - Daily

 - Weekly

 - General

 - Regional

 - Finance and economics

 - sports

 - Islamist

 - Women's

 - Online

Ar: 

Br: Berber

Fr: 

En: 

Sp:

Defunct daily newspapers
These newspapers are no longer published:

See also
 Media of Morocco
 OJD Morocco 
 List of magazines in Morocco
 Television in Morocco

References

  ojd.ma
  medias.ma

Bibliography
 
 

Morocco
 
N